"Canción sin miedo" is a song of the regional Mexican genre by Mexican composer Vivir Quintana that speaks about the violence experienced by women, it has become an anthem in feminist protests.

Song 
The song was a request from Chilean musician Mon Laferte, who contacted Quintana to ask her if she would like to do a song about feminicides, it was first performed at the 2020 Tiempo de Mujeres Festival concert performed by Mon Laferte, Vivir Quintana and the El Palomar choir, composed with over 70 women singers and musicians.

The song has been interpreted in different parts of the world, such as: Argentina, Chile, Colombia, Ecuador, Spain, Honduras, Peru, Greece, France, among others, to eradicate gender violence. By March 2023, the video on the songwriter's channel had 20 million reproductions.

In 2021 a mariachi version was released, performed by students from the Escuela de Mariachi Ollin Yoliztli. As well as an adaptation to the Yucatán context, with a translation and fragments in Mayan.

Lyrics 
The song describes the Mexican reality of violence against women, including disappearances and femicides, and also talks about the struggle of women against violence "Today they take away our calm from us women, they planted fear in us, they grew wings". In the words of the composer:

It is an object of study on how pain really makes us so close, it connects us women not only in Mexico, but also in Latin America and the world. It is like an oxymoron of sweet joy but also bitter sweetness.

References 

Feminist works
Mexican songs
Protest songs